George Todd may refer to:

George M. Todd (died 1864), Confederate guerrilla leader during the American Civil War 
George Davidson Todd (1856–1929), American politician, mayor of Louisville, Kentucky, 1896–1897
George 'Jocka' Todd (1903–1986), Australian rules footballer
George Todd (rugby league), English rugby league footballer of the 1930s

See also
George Tod, British surveyor
 George Tod (judge) (1773–1841), politician and judge in Ohio